Abu Dhabi Central Capital District, officially "Abu Dhabi Region", also "Abu Dhabi Metropolitan Area", is the municipal region in the Emirate of Abu Dhabi that contains the city of Abu Dhabi, distinct from the Eastern and Western municipal regions of the Emirate. Abu Dhabi City is the capital of both the Emirate and the United Arab Emirates, and has its own local government.

Geography and description 
Besides the city and island of Abu Dhabi, the region contains nearby settlements such as Al-Bahiyah, Mussafah, Khalifa City and Mohammed Bin Zayed City, and nearby islands such as Al-Aryam and Al-Saadiyat. Khalifa City is in the vicinity of Abu Dhabi International Airport, and Mafraq and Mussafah are industrial areas, with the latter having a sea port. As such, the region is economically important. Settlements:
 Abu Dhabi City (main settlement)
 Abu al Abyad
 Al-Aryam Island
 Al Bandar
 Al-Bahiyah
 Al Falah
 Al Lulu Island
 Al Maryah Island
 Al Rahah
 Al Rahbah
 Al Reem Island
 Al Samhah
 Al-Shahamah
 Al-Wathbah
 Al Shamkha
 Bani Yas City
 Dalma Island
 Ghantoot
 Halat al Bahrani
 Jubail Island
 Khalifa Industrial Zone
 Khalifa Port
 Masdar City
 Mina' Zayed
 Mussafah
 Saadiyat Island
 Yas Island

Ecology 

To the east of the island of Abu Dhabi is a national park with Grey mangroves. Arabic for "The Mangrove" is Al-Qurm, and it is the name of a corniche that is popular amongst residents of the city, near Sheikh Zayed Bin Sultan Street.

Also, the satellite town of Al-Wathba has a Ramsar wetland nearby.

Emirates Park Zoo 

In the area of Al-Bahiyah, near the Abu Dhabi – Dubai highway, is located the Emirates Park Zoo And Resort, which hosts over 1400 fauna, including rescued ones, and allows visitors to engage with them. For example, in October 2018, there was a programme in which visitors could have lunch with leopards, particularly the Amur leopard.

Transportation 
Abu Dhabi island has four highways and four road bridges which all connect the island to the mainland namely Sheikh Zayed road (E10) with Sheikh Zayed Bridge, Abu Dhabi-Al Ain road (E22) with Maqta Bridge, Abu Dhabi-Sweihan highway (E20) with Mussafah Bridge and The Abu Dhabi-Al Falah highway (E12) with Sheikh Khalifa Bridge. The Sheikh Zayed Bin Sultan Street, also known as Salam Street, is one of the busiest streets in Abu Dhabi Island, and goes near the mangroves located to the east of the island. It connects Abu Dhabi with the mainland through the Sheikh Zayed Bridge. The Abu Dhabi-Al Falah highway (E12) connects Abu Dhabi island to Saadiyat Island, Yas Island and other islands and to the mainland.

See also 
 Department of Municipal Affairs (Abu Dhabi)
 Dubai-Sharjah-Ajman metropolitan area
 Largest metropolitan areas of the Middle East
 List of cultural property of national significance in the United Arab Emirates
 List of tourist attractions in the United Arab Emirates

References

External links 
 Four Square

 
Municipal regions in the Emirate of Abu Dhabi
Metropolitan areas of the United Arab Emirates